The following is a list of notable alumni from Baylor School in Chattanooga, Tennessee.

1900s
Jo Conn Guild, 1905, electric utility manager and anti-TVA campaigner
George Hunter, 1907, Coca-Cola bottler and philanthropist; namesake of Hunter Hall on campus

1910s
Thomas Cartter Lupton, Coca-Cola bottler and philanthropist

1920s
Albert Hodges Morehead, 1925, bridge editor, The New York Times
Herman Hickman, 1928, College Football Hall of Fame member for the University of Tennessee; head football coach for Yale University

1930s
Thomas J. Anderson, 1930, author, farmer, and American Party presidential candidate
Hugh Beaumont, 1930, actor who played Ward Cleaver on Leave it to Beaver

1940s
Ralph Puckett, 1943, Medal of Honor recipient for heroism in the Korean War
David M. Abshire, 1944, former ambassador to NATO; former director of the Center for Strategic and International Studies; adviser to president Ronald Reagan
William E. Duff, 1945, author and FBI counterintelligence specialist
John T. Lupton II, 1944, Coca-Cola bottler and philanthropist
Scott L. Probasco, Jr., 1946, banker and philanthropist
Sidney A. Wallace, 1945, U.S. Coast Guard Rear Admiral

1950s
Dave Bristol, 1951, former Major League Baseball manager
Fob James, 1952, former governor of Alabama
Coleman Barks, 1955, poet and translator of the Sufi poet Rumi
Barry Moser, 1958, artist, illustrator, publisher
Charlie Norwood, 1959, dentist and congressman for Georgia in the 104th and six subsequent Congresses
Robert Taylor Segraves, 1959, psychiatrist, author

1960s
Philip Morehead, 1960, head of music staff of the Lyric Opera of Chicago, the Lyric Opera Center for American Artists, and the Patrick G. and Shirley W. Ryan Opera Center; conductor; editor; author
Wendell Rawls, Jr., 1960, journalist, Pulitzer Prize winner
Shelby Coffey III, 1964, journalist, editor of the Los Angeles Times, Dallas Morning News, and U.S. News & World Report; Trustee of the Newseum
Brian Gottfried, 1969, World No. 3-ranked tennis player 
John Hannah, 1969, NFL football player for the Patriots, Hall-of-Famer; after three years at Baylor, graduated from Albertville High School in Albertville, Alabama
Roscoe Tanner, 1969, professional tennis player, Australian Open winner; Wimbledon runner-up
Allen Trammel, football player

1970s
Arthur Golden, 1974, author, Memoirs of a Geisha
Robert E. Cooper, Jr., 1975, Tennessee attorney general
Bill Dedman, 1978, journalist, Pulitzer Prize winner, author of the bestselling book Empty Mansions: The Mysterious Life of Huguette Clark and the Spending of a Great American Fortune
Francis M. Fesmire, 1978, emergency physician, heart research scientist, "hero" of the American College of Emergency Physicians, and winner of the 2006 Ig Nobel Prize

1980s
Geoff Gaberino, 1980, swimmer, Olympic gold medalist
Alan Shuptrine, 1981, realist painter, gilder
Tim Kelly, 1985, current mayor of Chattanooga
Andy Berke, 1986, attorney, former Tennessee state Senator, and former mayor of Chattanooga

1990s
Devin Galligan, 1990, founder of the charity Strain the Brain
Aaron McCollough, 1990, poet

2000s
Blaire Pancake, 2000, Miss Tennessee
Luke List, 2003, professional golfer
Jacques McClendon, 2006, professional football player (guard)
Harris English, 2007, professional golfer
Brad Hamilton, 2008, competitive swimmer, multiple Jamaican record holder
 Stephan Jäger, 2008, professional golfer
 Keith Mitchell, 2010, professional golfer
 Reggie Upshaw, 2013, basketball player in the Israel Basketball Premier League
 Nick Tiano, 2015, American football player

References

Further reading
Hitt, James E.; It Never Rains After Three O'Clock: A History of the Baylor School, 1893-1968; Baylor School Press (Chattanooga, Tennessee), 1st Edition, (1971).

Baylor School Alumni
Baylor